Diphtheria is an infection caused by the bacterium Corynebacterium diphtheriae. Most infections are asymptomatic or have a mild clinical course, but in some outbreaks more than 10% of those diagnosed with the disease may die.  Signs and symptoms may vary from mild to severe and usually start two to five days after exposure. Symptoms often come on fairly gradually, beginning with a sore throat and fever. In severe cases, a grey or white patch develops in the throat. This can block the airway and create a barking cough as in croup. The neck may swell in part due to enlarged lymph nodes. A form of diphtheria which involves the skin, eyes or genitals also exists. Complications may include myocarditis, inflammation of nerves, kidney problems, and bleeding problems due to low levels of platelets. Myocarditis may result in an abnormal heart rate and inflammation of the nerves may result in paralysis.

Diphtheria is usually spread between people by direct contact or through the air. It may also be spread by contaminated objects. Some people carry the bacterium without having symptoms, but can still spread the disease to others. The three main types of C. diphtheriae cause different severities of disease. The symptoms are due to a toxin produced by the bacterium. Diagnosis can often be made based on the appearance of the throat with confirmation by microbiological culture. Previous infection may not protect against infection.

A diphtheria vaccine is effective for prevention and available in a number of formulations. Three or four doses, given along with tetanus vaccine and pertussis vaccine, are recommended during childhood. Further doses of diphtheria–tetanus vaccine are recommended every ten years. Protection can be verified by measuring the antitoxin level in the blood. Diphtheria can be prevented in those exposed as well as treated with the antibiotics erythromycin or benzylpenicillin. A tracheotomy is sometimes needed to open the airway in severe cases.

In 2015, 4,500 cases were officially reported worldwide, down from nearly 100,000 in 1980. About a million cases a year are believed to have occurred before the 1980s. Diphtheria currently occurs most often in sub-Saharan Africa, India, and Indonesia. In 2015, it resulted in 2,100 deaths, down from 8,000 deaths in 1990. In areas where it is still common, children are most affected. It is rare in the developed world due to widespread vaccination but can re-emerge if vaccination rates decrease. In the United States, 57 cases were reported between 1980 and 2004. Death occurs in 5% to 10% of those diagnosed. The disease was first described in the 5th century BC by Hippocrates. The bacterium was identified in 1882 by Edwin Klebs.

Signs and symptoms

The symptoms of diphtheria usually begin two to seven days after infection. They include fever of 38 °C (100.4 °F) or above; chills; fatigue; bluish skin coloration (cyanosis); sore throat; hoarseness; cough; headache; difficulty swallowing; painful swallowing; difficulty breathing; rapid breathing; foul-smelling and bloodstained nasal discharge; and lymphadenopathy. Within two to three days, diphtheria may destroy healthy tissues in the respiratory system. The dead tissue forms a thick, gray coating that can build up in the throat or nose. This thick gray coating is called a "pseudomembrane". It can cover tissues in the nose, tonsils, voice box, and throat, making it very hard to breathe and swallow. Symptoms can also include cardiac arrhythmias, myocarditis, and cranial and peripheral nerve palsies.

Diphtheritic croup 
Laryngeal diphtheria can lead to a characteristic swollen neck and throat, or "bull neck". The swollen throat is often accompanied by a serious respiratory condition, characterized by a brassy or "barking" cough, stridor, hoarseness, and difficulty breathing; and historically referred to variously as "diphtheritic croup", "true croup", or sometimes simply as "croup". Diphtheritic croup is extremely rare in countries where diphtheria vaccination is customary. As a result, the term "croup" nowadays most often refers to an unrelated viral illness that produces similar but milder respiratory symptoms.

Transmission 
Human-to-human transmission of diphtheria typically occurs through the air when an infected individual coughs or sneezes. Breathing in particles released from the infected individual leads to infection. Contact with any lesions on the skin can also lead to transmission of diphtheria, but this is uncommon. Indirect infections can occur, as well. If an infected individual touches a surface or object, the bacteria can be left behind and remain viable. Also, some evidence indicates diphtheria has the potential to be zoonotic, but this has yet to be confirmed. Corynebacterium ulcerans has been found in some animals, which would suggest zoonotic potential.

Mechanism
Diphtheria toxin (DT) is produced only by C. diphtheriae infected with a certain type of bacteriophage.  Toxinogenicity is determined by phage conversion (also called lysogenic conversion); i.e, the ability of the bacterium to make DT changes as a consequence of infection by a particular phage. DT is encoded by the tox gene. Strains of corynephage are either tox+ (e.g., corynephage β) or tox− (e.g., corynephage γ). The tox gene becomes integrated into the bacterial genome. The chromosome of C. diphtheriae has two different but functionally equivalent bacterial attachment sites (attB) for integration of β prophage into the chromosome.

Diphtheria toxin precursor is a protein of molecular weight 60 kDa. Certain proteases, such as trypsin, selectively cleave DT to generate two peptide chains, amino-terminal fragment A (DT-A) and carboxyl-terminal fragment B (DT-B), which are held together by a disulfide bond. DT-B is a recognition subunit that gains entry of DT into the host cell by binding to the EGF-like domain of heparin-binding EGF-like growth factor  on the cell surface. This signals the cell to internalize the toxin within an endosome via receptor-mediated endocytosis. Inside the endosome, DT is split by a trypsin-like protease into DT-A and DT-B. The acidity of the endosome causes DT-B to create pores in the endosome membrane, thereby catalysing the release of DT-A into the cytoplasm.

Fragment A inhibits the synthesis of new proteins in the affected cell by catalyzing ADP-ribosylation of elongation factor EF-2—a protein that is essential to the translation step of protein synthesis. This ADP-ribosylation involves the transfer of an ADP-ribose from NAD+ to a diphthamide (a modified histidine) residue within the EF-2 protein. Since EF-2 is needed for the moving of tRNA from the A-site to the P-site of the ribosome during protein translation, ADP-ribosylation of EF-2 prevents protein synthesis.

ADP-ribosylation of EF-2 is reversed by giving high doses of nicotinamide (a form of vitamin B3), since this is one of the reaction's end products, and high amounts drive the reaction in the opposite direction.

Diagnosis
The current clinical case definition of diphtheria used by the United States' Centers for Disease Control and Prevention  is based on both laboratory and clinical criteria.

Laboratory criteria
 Isolation of C. diphtheriae from a Gram stain or throat culture from a clinical specimen,
 Histopathologic diagnosis of diphtheria by Albert's stain

Toxin demonstration
 In vivo tests (guinea pig inoculation): Subcutaneous and intracutaneous tests
 In vitro test: Elek's gel precipitation test, detection of tox gene by PCR, ELISA, ICA

Clinical criteria
 Upper respiratory tract illness with sore throat
 Low-grade fever (above  is rare)
 An adherent, dense, grey pseudomembrane covering the posterior aspect of the pharynx: in severe cases, it can extend to cover the entire tracheobronchial tree.

Case classification
 Probable: a clinically compatible case that is not laboratory-confirmed and is not epidemiologically linked to a laboratory-confirmed case
 Confirmed: a clinically compatible case that is either laboratory-confirmed or epidemiologically linked to a laboratory-confirmed case

Empirical treatment should generally be started in a patient in whom suspicion of diphtheria is high.

Prevention

Vaccination against diphtheria is commonly done in infants and delivered as a combination vaccine, such as a DPT vaccine (diphtheria, pertussis, tetanus). Pentavalent vaccines, which vaccinate against diphtheria and four other childhood diseases simultaneously, are frequently used in disease prevention programs in developing countries by organizations such as UNICEF.

Treatment
The disease may remain manageable, but in more severe cases, lymph nodes in the neck may swell, and breathing and swallowing are more difficult. People in this stage should seek immediate medical attention, as obstruction in the throat may require intubation or a tracheotomy. Abnormal cardiac rhythms can occur early in the course of the illness or weeks later and can lead to heart failure. Diphtheria can also cause paralysis in the eye, neck, throat, or respiratory muscles. Patients with severe cases are put in a hospital intensive care unit and given diphtheria antitoxin (consisting of antibodies isolated from the serum of horses that have been challenged with diphtheria toxin). Since antitoxin does not neutralize toxin that is already bound to tissues, delaying its administration increases risk of death. Therefore, the decision to administer diphtheria antitoxin is based on clinical diagnosis, and should not await laboratory confirmation.

Antibiotics have not been demonstrated to affect healing of local infection in diphtheria patients treated with antitoxin. Antibiotics are used in patients or carriers to eradicate C. diphtheriae and prevent its transmission to others. The Centers for Disease Control and Prevention recommends either:
 Metronidazole
 Erythromycin is given (orally or by injection) for 14 days (40 mg/kg per day with a maximum of 2 g/d), or
 Procaine penicillin G is given intramuscularly for 14 days (300,000 U/d for patients weighing <10 kg and 600,000 U/d for those weighing >10 kg); patients with allergies to penicillin G or erythromycin can use rifampin or clindamycin.

In cases that progress beyond a throat infection, diphtheria toxin spreads through the blood and can lead to potentially life-threatening complications that affect other organs, such as the heart and kidneys. Damage to the heart caused by the toxin affects the heart's ability to pump blood or the kidneys' ability to clear wastes. It can also cause nerve damage, eventually leading to paralysis. About 40% to 50% of those left untreated can die.

Epidemiology 

Diphtheria is fatal in between 5% and 10% of cases. In children under five years and adults over 40 years, the fatality rate may be as much as 20%. In 2013, it resulted in 3,300 deaths, down from 8,000 deaths in 1990. Better standards of living, mass immunization, improved diagnosis, prompt treatment, and more effective health care have led to a decrease in cases worldwide.

History

In 1705, the Mariana Islands experienced an epidemic of diphtheria and typhus simultaneously, reducing the population to about 5,000 people. 

In 1735, a diphtheria epidemic swept through New England.

Before 1826, diphtheria was known by different names across the world. In England, it was known as Boulogne sore throat, as it spread from France. In 1826, Pierre Bretonneau gave the disease the name diphthérite (from Greek διφθέρα, diphthera 'leather') describing the appearance of pseudomembrane in the throat.

In 1856, Victor Fourgeaud described an epidemic of diphtheria in California.

In 1878, Princess Alice (Queen Victoria's second daughter) and her family became infected with diphtheria: Princess Alice and her four-year-old daughter Princess Marie both died.

In 1883, Edwin Klebs identified the bacterium causing diphtheria and named it Klebs–Loeffler bacterium. The club shape of this bacterium helped Edwin to differentiate it from other bacteria. Over the period of time, it was called Microsporon diphtheriticum, Bacillus diphtheriae, and Mycobacterium diphtheriae. Current nomenclature is Corynebacterium diphtheriae.

Friedrich Loeffler was the first person to cultivate C. diphtheriae in 1884. He used Koch's postulates to prove association between C. diphtheriae and diphtheria. He also showed that the bacillus produces an exotoxin.

Joseph P. O'Dwyer introduced the O'Dwyer tube for laryngeal intubation in patients with an obstructed larynx in 1885. It soon replaced tracheostomy as the emergency diphtheric intubation method.

In 1888, Emile Roux and Alexandre Yersin showed that a substance produced by C. diphtheriae caused symptoms of diphtheria in animals.

In 1890, Shibasaburō Kitasato and Emil von Behring immunized guinea pigs with heat-treated diphtheria toxin. They also immunized goats and horses in the same way and showed that an "antitoxin" made from serum of immunized animals could cure the disease in non-immunized animals. Behring used this antitoxin (now known to consist of antibodies that neutralize the toxin produced by C. diphtheriae) for human trials in 1891, but they were unsuccessful. Successful treatment of human patients with horse-derived antitoxin began in 1894, after production and quantification of antitoxin had been optimized. Von Behring won the first Nobel Prize in medicine in 1901 for his work on diphtheria.

In 1895, H. K. Mulford Company of Philadelphia started production and testing of diphtheria antitoxin in the United States. Park and Biggs described the method for producing serum from horses for use in diphtheria treatment.

In 1897, Paul Ehrlich developed a standardized unit of measure for diphtheria antitoxin. This was the first ever standardization of a biological product, and played an important role in future developmental work on sera and vaccines.

In 1901, 10 of 11 inoculated St. Louis children died from contaminated diphtheria antitoxin. The horse from which the antitoxin was derived died of tetanus. This incident, coupled with a tetanus outbreak in Camden, New Jersey, played an important part in initiating federal regulation of biologic products.

On 7 January 1904, Ruth Cleveland died of diphtheria at the age of 12 years in Princeton, New Jersey. Ruth was the eldest daughter of former President Grover Cleveland and the former first lady Frances Folsom.

In 1905, Franklin Royer, from Philadelphia's Municipal Hospital, published a paper urging timely treatment for diphtheria and adequate doses of antitoxin. In 1906, Clemens Pirquet and Béla Schick described serum sickness in children receiving large quantities of horse-derived antitoxin.

Between 1910 and 1911, Béla Schick developed the Schick test to detect pre-existing immunity to diphtheria in an exposed person. Only those who had not been exposed to diphtheria were vaccinated. A massive, five-year campaign was coordinated by Dr. Schick. As a part of the campaign, 85 million pieces of literature were distributed by the Metropolitan Life Insurance Company with an appeal to parents to "Save your child from diphtheria." A vaccine was developed in the next decade, and deaths began declining significantly in 1924.

In 1919, in Dallas, Texas, 10 children were killed and 60 others made seriously ill by toxic antitoxin which had passed the tests of the New York State Health Department. Mulford Company of Philadelphia (manufacturers) paid damages in every case.

In the 1920s, each year an estimated 100,000 to 200,000 diphtheria cases and 13,000 to 15,000 deaths occurred in the United States. Children represented a large majority of these cases and fatalities. One of the most infamous outbreaks of diphtheria occurred in 1925, in Nome, Alaska; the "Great Race of Mercy" to deliver diphtheria antitoxin is now celebrated by the Iditarod Trail Sled Dog Race.

In 1926, Alexander Thomas Glenny increased the effectiveness of diphtheria toxoid (a modified version of the toxin used for vaccination) by treating it with aluminum salts. Vaccination with toxoid was not widely used until the early 1930s. In 1939, Dr. Nora Wattie Principal Medical Officer (Maternity and Child Welfare) introduced immunisation clinics across Glasgow, and promoted mother and child health education, resulting in virtual eradication of the infection in the city.

Widespread vaccination pushed cases in the United States down from 4.4 per 100,000 inhabitants in 1932 to 2.0 in 1937. In Nazi Germany, where authorities preferred treatment and isolation over vaccination (until about 1939–1941), cases rose over the same period from 6.1 to 9.6 per 100,000 inhabitants.

Between June 1942 and February 1943, 714 cases of diphtheria were recorded at Sham Shui Po Barracks, resulting in 112 deaths because the Imperial Japanese Army did not release supplies of anti-diphtheria serum.

In 1943, diphtheria outbreaks accompanied war and disruption in Europe. The 1 million cases in Europe resulted in 50,000 deaths.

In Kyoto during 1948, 68 of 606 children died after diphtheria immunization due to improper manufacture of aluminum phosphate toxoid.

In 1974, the World Health Organization included DPT vaccine in their Expanded Programme on Immunization for developing countries.

In 1975, an outbreak of cutaneous diphtheria in Seattle, Washington, was reported.

After the breakup of the former Soviet Union in 1991, vaccination rates in its constituent countries fell so low that an explosion of diphtheria cases occurred. In 1991, 2,000 cases of diphtheria occurred in the USSR. Between 1991 and 1998 as many as 200,000 cases in the Commonwealth of Independent States were reported, with 5,000 deaths. In 1994, the Russian Federation had 39,703 diphtheria cases. By contrast, in 1990, only 1,211 cases were reported.

In early May 2010, a case of diphtheria was diagnosed in Port-au-Prince, Haiti, after the devastating 2010 Haiti earthquake. The 15-year-old male patient died while workers searched for antitoxin.

In 2013, three children died of diphtheria in Hyderabad, India.

In early June 2015, a case of diphtheria was diagnosed at Vall d'Hebron University Hospital in Barcelona, Spain. The six-year-old child who died of the illness had not been previously vaccinated due to parental opposition to vaccination. It was the first case of diphtheria in the country since 1986 as reported by "El Mundo" or from 1998, as reported by WHO.

In March 2016, a three-year-old girl died of diphtheria in the University Hospital of Antwerp, Belgium.

In June 2016, a three-year-old, five-year-old, and seven-year-old girl died of diphtheria in Kedah, Malacca, and Sabah, Malaysia.

In January 2017, more than 300 cases were recorded in Venezuela.

In 2017, outbreaks occurred in a Rohingya refugee camp in Bangladesh, and in children unvaccinated due to the Yemeni Civil War.

In November and December 2017, an outbreak of diphtheria occurred in Indonesia with more than 600 cases found and 38 fatalities.

In November 2019, two cases of diphtheria occurred in the Lothian area of Scotland. Additionally, in November 2019 an unvaccinated 8-year-old boy died of diphtheria in Athens, Greece.

In July 2022, two cases of diphtheria occurred in northern New South Wales, Australia.

In October 2022 there was an outbreak of diphtheria at the former Manston airfield, a former MoD site in Kent, England, which had been converted to an asylum seeker processing centre. The capacity of the processing centre was 1,000 people, though about 3,000 were living at the site with some accommodated in tents. The Home Office, the government department responsible for asylum seekers, refused to confirm the number of cases.

References

Further reading
 
 "Antitoxin dars 1735 and 1740." The William and Mary Quarterly, 3rd Ser., Vol 6, No 2. p. 338.

External links

 
 Mapping diphtheria-pertussis-tetanus vaccine coverage in Africa, 2000–2016: a spatial and temporal modelling study

 
Bacterial diseases
Wikipedia medicine articles ready to translate
Wikipedia emergency medicine articles ready to translate
Vaccine-preventable diseases